Philip E. Haines (born December 31, 1950) is an American Republican politician who served in the New Jersey Senate from January 8, 2008, to October 18, 2010, where he represented the 8th legislative district. He resigned his Senate seat to serve on the New Jersey Superior Court in Burlington County.

Biography
Haines received a B.A. from La Salle University majoring in History and Political Science, and was awarded a J.D. from Rutgers School of Law–Newark. He served in the United States Army from 1970 to 1976, as an E-4.

Haines served on the Burlington County Board of Chosen Freeholders from 1997 to 1999 and served as the Burlington County Clerk from 2000 until his election to the State Senate. He served on the New Jersey Council on Armed Forces and Veterans Affairs from 1999 to 2004.

In the Senate, Haines served on the Budget and Appropriations Committee and the Community and Urban Affairs Committee.

Haines was expected to receive a nomination to a Superior Court judgeship after the 2009 general elections were completed. On October 18, 2010, he was confirmed for the Justice of Burlington County Superior Court.

Haines previously worked as an attorney with the firm of Caplan Haines. He is a resident of the Juliustown section of Springfield Township, Burlington County, New Jersey.

References

External links
Senator Phil Haines's Official Site (archive)
Senator Haines' legislative web page, New Jersey Legislature
New Jersey Legislature financial disclosure forms
2009 2008  2007

1950 births
Living people
La Salle University alumni
County commissioners in New Jersey
New Jersey lawyers
Politicians from Burlington County, New Jersey
Republican Party New Jersey state senators
People from Springfield Township, Burlington County, New Jersey
Rutgers School of Law–Newark alumni
United States Army soldiers